Andrew Ross (13 January 1892 – 21 June 1981) was a Scotland international rugby union player from Edinburgh. He played at Lock.

Rugby Union career

Amateur career

He played rugby union for Edinburgh University.

Provincial career

He was capped by Edinburgh District in the inter city game against Glasgow District on 3 December 1910.

He played for the Whites Trial side against Blues Trial on 21 January 1911, scoring a try in a 26–19 win for the Whites.

International career

He was capped 4 times for Scotland from 1911 to 1914.

References

1892 births
1981 deaths
Scottish rugby union players
Scotland international rugby union players
Rugby union players from Edinburgh
Whites Trial players
Edinburgh District (rugby union) players
Royal HSFP players
Edinburgh University RFC players
Rugby union locks